Some Enchanted Evening is a popular song from the musical play South Pacific.

Some Enchanted Evening may also refer to:

Television
"Some Enchanted Evening" (The Simpsons), an episode of The Simpsons
"Some Enchanted Evening", an episode of Bless This House
"Some Enchanted Evening", an episode of Last of the Summer Wine
"Some Enchanted Evening", an episode of Man About the House

Music
Some Enchanted Evening (Blue Öyster Cult album) (1978)
Some Enchanted Evening (Art Garfunkel album) (2007)
Some Enchanted Evening, Bryn Terfel album (2007)